SOC or SoC may refer to:

Science and technology
 Science Operations Centre, a center of the European Space Agency
 Information security operations center, in an organization, a centralized unit that deals with computer security issues
 Selectable output control
 Separation of concerns, a program design principle in computer science and software engineering
 Service-oriented communications
 Service-oriented computing, another term for Service-oriented architecture
 Soil organic carbon, see Soil carbon
 Solid Oxide Cell, an electrochemical conversion device operating either in SOFC, SOEC, or rSOC mode
 Specialized Oceanographic Center, a center of the US National Oceanic and Atmospheric Administration
 Spectrum Operations Committee, a Stanford University independent research center
 spin–orbit coupling
 State of charge, for batteries
 Store-Operated Calcium channel
 Super Optimal Broth with catabolite repression, a bacterial growth medium
 Superior olivary complex
 System on a chip (SoC), in electronic design
 System Organ Class, an organizational division in the dictionary MedDRA
 Substance of Concern

Associations and societies
 Scottish Ornithologists' Club
 Scouts of China
 Serbian Orthodox Church
 Société des Ornithologistes du Canada, the French name of the Society of Canadian Ornithologists
 Society of Cartographers, United Kingdom
 Society of Operating Cameramen, the original name for the Society of Camera Operators
 Special Olympics Canada
 Syrian Opposition Coalition, better known as the National Coalition

Businesses
 SOC Films, a film company founded by Pakistani filmmaker and journalist Sharmeen Obaid-Chinoy
 Sirte Oil Company
 Social overhead capital
 South Oil Company
 SOC Telemed, a telemedicine company backed by Warburg Pincus 
 SOC LLC, a security company owned by Day & Zimmermann
 System and Organization Controls, a suite of reports produced during an audit

Military
 Curtiss SOC Seagull, a US Navy scout observation seaplane produced by Curtiss, first in service in 1935
 Marine expeditionary unit (special operations capable), (MEU (SOC)) a former United States Marine Corps term for a Marine Expeditionary Unit (MEU)
 Special Operations Command (disambiguation)

Mathematics
 Second-order condition, a mathematical condition that distinguishes maxima and minima from other stationary points
 Self-organized criticality, a property of dynamical systems in physics

Other uses
 Adisumarmo International Airport (IATA: SOC), Indonesia
 Google Summer of Code
 Security operations center, in an organization, a centralized unit that deals with security issues
 The Settlers of Catan, a multiplayer board game
 Shippers Owned Container, intermodal container owned by the shipper or receiver instead of by the shipping line
 Soc (subculture), a 1950s precursor to the preppy look
 Sound of Contact, a British-based rock band
 S.T.A.L.K.E.R.: Shadow of Chernobyl, a video game
 Standard Occupational Classification System, a system of the United States Department of Labor
 Standard of care, medical or psychological treatment guideline, and can be general or specific
 E.g., the Standards of Care for the Health of Transgender and Gender Diverse People
 State of Cambodia, the official English name of the Cambodian pro-Hanoi People's Republic of Kampuchea (PRK) during the transitional times that led to the restoration of the monarchy (1989–1993)
 Statement of claim, a legal document on which one states a cause of action
 Strategic Organizing Center, a group of United States labor unions
 Stream of consciousness (disambiguation), a writing or psychological style with disjointed thoughts
 Swedish Open Championships, an annual table tennis tournament